The Roman Catholic Diocese of Uberlândia is a diocese located in the city of Uberlândia in the Ecclesiastical province of Uberaba in Brazil.

History
 22 July 1961: Established as Diocese of Uberlândia from the Diocese of Uberaba

Bishops
 Bishops of Uberlândia (Roman rite), in reverse chronological order
 Bishop Paulo Francisco Machado (2008.01.02 – present)
 Bishop José Alberto Moura, C.S.S.  (1992.12.23 – 2007.02.07), appointed Archbishop of Montes Claros, Minas Gerais
 Bishop Estêvão Cardoso de Avellar, O.P. (1978.03.20 – 1992.12.23)
 Bishop Almir Marques Ferreira (1961.08.19 – 1977.12.01)

Coadjutor bishops
Onofre Cândido Rosa, S.D.B. (1971-1977), did not succeed to see; appointed Coadjutor Bishop of Corumbá, Mato Grosso do Sul
José Alberto Moura, C.S.S. (1990-1992)

Auxiliary bishop
Onofre Cândido Rosa, S.D.B. (1970-1971), appointed Coadjutor here

References

 GCatholic.org
 Catholic Hierarchy
 Diocese website (Portuguese)

Roman Catholic dioceses in Brazil
Christian organizations established in 1961
Uberlandia, Roman Catholic Diocese of
Roman Catholic dioceses and prelatures established in the 20th century
1961 establishments in Brazil